Events from the year 1596 in France

Incumbents
 Monarch – Henry IV

Events

Siege of Calais
Tract of alliance between England, France and the United Netherlands

Births
31 March – René Descartes, French philosopher (died 1650 in Sweden)
6 June – Michel Particelli d'Emery (died 1650)
5 November – Charles II, Duke of Elbeuf, nobleman (died 1657)
11 November – Catherine Henriette de Bourbon (died 1663)

Deaths

19 February – Blaise de Vigenère, diplomat, cryptographer, translator and alchemist (born 1523)
5 May – Catherine de Montpensier, politically active duchess (born 1552)
3 October – Florent Chrestien, satirist and poet (born 1541)
1 November – Pierre Pithou, lawyer and scholar (born 1539)

Full date missing
Jean Bodin, philosopher and politician (born 1530)

See also

References

1590s in France